Live from Austin TX is the fourth album and the first live album by American blues artist Susan Tedeschi, released in 2004.

Track listing
"You Can Make It If You Try" (Sylvester Stewart) – 2:16
"The Feeling Music Brings" (Kofi Burbridge, Tedeschi, Derek Trucks) – 5:20
"Alone" (Tommy Sims) – 3:49
"Wait for Me" (Felix Reyes) – 5:58
"Hampmotized" (Jason Crosby, Ron Perry, Jeff Sipe, Tedeschi) – 7:41
"Love's in Need of Love Today" (Stevie Wonder) – 4:16
"Don't Think Twice, It's All Right" (Bob Dylan) – 4:34
"Voodoo Woman" (Koko Taylor) – 5:36
"In the Garden" (Tommy Shannon, Tedeschi) – 3:51
"Gonna Move" (Paul Pena) – 4:56
"Wrapped in the Arms of Another" (Tedeschi) – 3:06
"It Hurt So Bad" (Tom Hambridge) – 6:01
"Lost Lover Blues" (Don Robey) – 8:24
"I Fell in Love" (Hambridge, Tedeschi) – 4:45
"Angel from Montgomery" (John Prine) – 6:33

Personnel
Susan Tedeschi - guitar, vocals
Jason Crosby - violin, keyboards, vocals
William Green - Hammond organ, vocals
Ron Perry - bass, vocals
Jeff Sipe - drums, vocals

Production
Producers: Gary Briggs, Cameron Strang
Executive producer: Cameron Strang
Engineer: David Hough
Mixing: Chet Himes
Mastering: Jerry Tubb
Design: Katherine Delaney
Photography: Scott Newton
Liner notes: Terry Lickona

References

Susan Tedeschi albums
2004 live albums
New West Records live albums
Austin City Limits